La herencia (English title:The inheritance) is a Mexican telenovela produced by Televisa and transmitted by Telesistema Mexicano.

Cast 
Joaquín Cordero
María Teresa Rivas
Alicia Gutiérrez
Aurora Alvarado
Eric del Castillo
Alicia Montoya
David Reynoso
José Elías Moreno

References 

Mexican telenovelas
1962 telenovelas
Televisa telenovelas
1962 Mexican television series debuts
1962 Mexican television series endings
Spanish-language telenovelas